Hang Tuah Jaya Municipal Council (MPHTJ) is the local authority which administers Hang Tuah Jaya, a municipality covering an area of  and consists of the northern part of Melaka Tengah District, the western part of Jasin District and the southeastern part of Alor Gajah District in Malacca, Malaysia.

Like all local governments in Malaysia, MPHTJ are responsible for public health and sanitation, waste removal and management, town planning, environmental protection and building control, social and economic development and general maintenance functions of the town's urban infrastructure. The MPHTJ main headquarters is located at Melaka Mall (formerly known as Kotamas) in Ayer Keroh, Hang Tuah Jaya, opposite the headquarters of Malacca City Council along Lebuh Ayer Keroh. 

Hang Tuah Jaya Municipal Council was established under Section 3 of the Local Government Act 1976, (Act 171) as the Local Authority of Hang Tuah Jaya and began operations on 1 January 2010.

Organisation

List of presidents

Departments and Units
12 Departments and 5 Units
 Internal Audit Unit
 Law Unit
 One Stop Centre Unit
 Arrears Management Unit
 Integrity Unit
 Management Service Department
 Financial Deprtment
 Enforcement Department
 Property Evaluation and Management Department
 Urban Planning Department
 Engineering Department
 Licensing Department
 Corporate and Social Service Department
 Zoo Department
 Information Technology Department
 Landscape and Environmental Health Department
 Building Control Department

See also
 Malacca City Council
 Iskandar Puteri City Council
 Putrajaya Corporation

References

External links 

MPHTJ official portal

2010 establishments in Malaysia
Hang Tuah Jaya